Eldev Coal Mine is  in Dalanjargalan sum (district) of Dornogovi Province in South-Eastern Mongolia.  This mine is 21 km N from sum center (Olon Ovoo railway station of the Trans-Mongolian Railway) and 300 km SE of Mongolian capital Ulan Bator.

Eldev mine is operated by Mongolyn Alt Corporation (MAK) LLC, a mining and processing company of Mongolia.

Major customers of the Eldev coal mine in Mongolia:
- Erdenet Mining Corporation
- Khutul Cement & Lime Plant
- Darkhan Metallurgical Plant
- Ulaanbaatar Railway JV, an operator of the Trans-Mongolian Railway
- Darkhan City Power Plant

References

 Eldev Coal Mine owners web site accessed 10 October 2017

Coal mines in Mongolia
Surface mines in Mongolia